The Stephenville Jets are a senior ice hockey team based in Stephenville, Newfoundland and Labrador and part of the Newfoundland Senior Hockey League.

History
The Jets hockey club was founded as the Stephenville Monarchs in 1975. The Monarchs joined the Newfoundland Senior Hockey League (NSHL) for the 1975-76 season. The team changed their name before following season to the Stephenville Jets 

Hector Caines was the first coach for the Monarchs who debuted in Corner Brook on November 15. 1975 losing 8-4 to the hometown Royals. The club made their debut at their home rink, the Stephenville Gardens, on November 16. At the end of their inaugural season, the Monarchs finished in last place with 8 points. Beginning with the 1982-83 season, the Jets won four straight Evening Telegram Trophies for finishing first place in the regular season.

The Jets were back-to-back winners of the Herder Memorial Trophy in 1983 and 1984 as all-Newfoundland senior hockey champions. 

The Stephenville Jets were deep in debt after the 1988-89 season and folded prior to the next season.

Seasons and records

Season by season results

Note: GP = Games played, W = Wins, L = Losses, T = Ties, OTL = Overtime Losses, Pts = Points, GF = Goals for, GA = Goals against, DNQ = Did not qualify

NSHL = Newfoundland Senior Hockey League

Allan Cup Results

Leaders

Team captains

Head coaches
Hector Caines, 1975-76
Mike Power, 1979-80
Don Howse, 1981-82 to 1986-87 (playing-coach)
Brian Abbey, 1986-87
Kevin-Morrison, 1987-88 to 1988-89 (playing-coach)
Cal Dunville, 1988-89
Heber Rideout, 1988-89

Trophies and awards

Team awards
Two all-Newfoundland senior hockey championships (Herder Memorial Trophy): 1983, 1984
Four straight first-place finishes in Newfoundland Senior Hockey League regular season (Evening Telegram Trophy): 1983, 1984, 1985, 1986

Individual awards

S. E Tuma Memorial Trophy (Top scorer in the regular season)
Bruce Campbell, 1983

T.A. (Gus) Soper Memorial Award (MVP in the regular season)
Gary Dunville, 1984
Zane Forbes, 1985

Albert "Peewee" Crane Memorial Trophy (Senior league rookie of the year)
Cal Dunville, 1976
Juan Strickland, 1983

Howie Clouter memorial Trophy (Most sportsmanlike player in the regular season)
Juan Strickland, 1983
Wayne Dove, 1984
Andy Sullivan, 1985, 1986

President's Goaltender's Award (Top goaltender in the regular season)
Gary Dunville, 1983, 1984, 1985

Honoured Members

NL Hockey Hall of Fame
The following people associated with the Jets have been inducted into the Newfoundland and Labrador Hockey Hall of Fame.
Cal Dunville, 1997
Don Howse, 2000
Zane Forbes, 2000
Andy Sullivan, 2005
Kevin Morrison, 2018

References

Bibliography

Ice hockey in Newfoundland and Labrador
Ice hockey teams in Newfoundland and Labrador
Stephenville, Newfoundland and Labrador